Good Vibes is the debut album by the Oakland, California group The Natural Four.  Released in 1970 on ABC Records, this would be their only release with the label before moving on to Curtis Mayfield's Curtom Records imprint.

Track listing
"Why Should We Stop Now" (Ricky Jones) - 	 3:17   	
"I Thought You Were Mine" (Lonnie Cook) -	2:35 	
"The Situation Needs No Explanation" (Earl Randle) -	2:41 	
"Same Thing in Mind" (Ricky Jones) - 	3:19 	
"Stepping On Up" (Al Bowden, Lloyd Gregory, Ollan Christopher James) -	2:44 	
"Hurt" (Marvin Holmes) -	3:10 	
"Going in Circles" (Anita Poree, Jerry Peters) -	3:21 	
"All God's Children Got Soul" (Booker T. Jones, William Bell) - 	3:09 	
"Blue Velvet" (Bernie Wayne, Lee Morris) - 	5:53 	
"Message from a Black Man" (Norman Whitfield, Barrett Strong) -	3:27

Charts

Singles

References

External links
 The Natural Four-Good Vibes at Discogs

1970 debut albums
The Natural Four albums
ABC Records albums